Visual literacy in education develops a student's visual literacy – their ability to comprehend, make meaning of, and communicate through visual means, usually in the form of images or multimedia.

History
Images have always been involved in learning with pictures and artwork to help define history or literary works. There is also a long tradition of using texts as educational images that reaches back to the Enlightenment.  However, visual literacy in education is becoming a much broader and extensive body of learning and comprehension. This is due to the integration of images and visual presentations in the curriculum as technology and the increasing availability of computers.

Traditionally, in education in particular, the conventional approach was that young learners acquired conventions of print which made each student a discursive learner. As we have recognized that there are multiple learning
styles which better suit some students, some are text oriented, others are visual, kinesthetic, auditory, or a combination of two or more, developers of educational materials have adapted and made use of new media and technology. In 1989, there was a call for new curriculum in social studies, which was uniquely suited to bringing visual information to educational programs by introducing map reading skills, charts and graphs for analyzing data, primary source visuals from the period ephemera, and paintings, sculpture, architecture, objects of daily use, and other evidence of material culture that is the archive from which historians draw their information about past and present cultures. Materials that were embraced for their visual energy, authenticity, and characteristic interest to engage students were prepared by a research and development group named Ligature, whose design director, Josef Godlewski (July 3, 1948 – April 8, 2013), a teacher of graphic design at The Rhode Island School of Design, brought to what is now the accepted integration of visuals with text that we see in print and media board learning programs.

Advancements of multimedia
Multimedia advancements have redefined what it means to teach literacy in the classroom. Today, students must be able to present and decode written and visual images, presenting educators with the task of teaching visual literacy in the classroom. Students today are using PowerPoint, PhotoStory, MovieMaker and other tools to create presentations in the classroom. This presents a challenge to educators as they seek to empower their students with the necessary tools to thrive in a media-driven environment.

Educators now understand that students lack the skills to accurately decipher and make ethical decisions based on that image. According to Susan Metros of the University of Southern California, students find themselves able to view pictures, read a map and input data, but are unable to create an image, map data and understand why one chart is better than another. To better prepare students, school districts are taking it upon themselves to add a technology component to their curriculum. For example, instead of submitting papers, students can create short films or interactive essays. This promotes a hands-on approach to multimedia for students to learn new tools.

Teaching visual literacy
Teaching visual literacy in the classroom means many things from film, dance, and mime through the use of diagrams, maps and graphs to children's picture books. Visual texts can be found in books, the internet, environmental signage, TV, tablet devices and touch-screen machines like ATMs. It includes teaching students to critically analyze the images presented to them through advertising and other media. It also entails equipping students with the tools to create presentations that effectively communicate content. Today teachers are using classroom blogs and wikis to keep their students up to date with class requirements and to encourage collaborative class discussions. More and more students are relying on technology to enhance their learning environments. As technology continues to advance, their availability and capability  will create more tools for teachers to utilize.

An attempt to observe children reading and writing visual texts was made by twenty US and Australian teachers in 1990-94, and followed up in 2011. The results were published in Steve Moline, I See What You Mean; Visual literacy K-8 (Stenhouse, 1995, rev. ed. 2011). The visual texts studied were limited to those used in information books, e-books, and websites, such as diagrams, maps, storyboards, flowcharts, time lines, webs, trees and tables. Moline claims that the strategy he calls recomposing assists in essay planning and comprehension. Recomposing is described  as reading information in a lexical format (such as a paragraph of sentences) and summarizing it in a visual format (such as a flowchart or table). The visual text then forms the framework for the child when writing her/his essay on the topic.

Benefits
Computers have become a major part of society. People must learn to communicate through images, as technology continues to evolve.

Uses in higher education
As technology advances, so too do the tools that teachers gain in teaching visual literacy skills to students. Scientific virtual models and figures, digital mapping, and other computer-based visual programs are all tools available as resources for higher education in schools. These tools can be used to "promote students' capabilities and skills" and create a new understanding of writing and learning in the classroom.

See also
 Learning Through Art
 Visual culture
 Visual literacy

Footnotes

External links
 Visual literacy in primary, elementary and junior secondary classrooms

Visual arts education
Education by subject
Visual arts theory
Literacy